National Highway 544D, commonly called NH 544D is a national highway in  India. It is a spur road of National Highway 44.  NH-544D traverses the state of Andhra Pradesh in India.

Route 
Anantapur, Tadipatri, Kolimigundla, Owk, Banaganapalli, Nandyal, Gajualapalli, Giddalur, Cumbum, Thokapalli, Vinukonda, Narasaraopet, Guntur.

Junctions  
 
  Terminal near Ananthpur.
  near Tadipatri.
  near Nandyal.
  near Narasaraopet.
  Terminal near Guntur.

See also 
 List of National Highways in India
 List of National Highways in India by state

References

External links 

 NH 544D on OpenStreetMap

National highways in India
National Highways in Andhra Pradesh